Inglefield may refer to:

Geography 
In Canada:
 The Inglefield Mountains in southeastern Ellesmere Island

In the United States:
 Inglefield, Indiana

In Greenland
 Inglefield Gulf
 Inglefield Land

Naval History
 , a World War Two Royal Navy destroyer launched in 1936 and sunk off Anzio on 25 February 1944

People
 Sir Thomas Englefield (or Inglefield) (c. 1450–1514),  Speaker of England's House of Commons from 1496 to 1497 and again in 1509
 Sir Derrick William Inglefield Inglefield-Watson (1901–1987) and Sir John Forbes Inglefield-Watson (1926–2007), 4th and 5th Watson baronets of Earnock
 John Nicholson Inglefield (1748–1828), Royal Navy officer and father of Samuel Hood Inglefield
 Samuel Hood Inglefield (1783–1848), a distinguished Royal Navy officer, artist and father of Edward Augustus Inglefield
 Sir Edward Augustus Inglefield (1820–1894), a Royal Navy officer, arctic explorer and father of Edward Fitzmaurice Inglefield
 Sir Edward Fitzmaurice Inglefield (1861–1945), a Royal Navy officer, son of Edward Augustus Inglefield, inventor of the Inglefield clip, and later Secretary of Lloyd's of London
 Sir Frederick Samuel Inglefield (1854–1921), Royal Navy admiral.
 Sir Gilbert Inglefield (1909–1991), Lord Mayor of the City of London in 1967, son of Sir Frederick Samuel Inglefield.

Other uses
 Inglefield clip, a clip for joining flags quickly, easily and securely to flag halyards